Marvin Eugene Whited, Jr. (July 26, 1918 – June 13, 1957) was an American football guard in the National Football League (NFL) for the Washington Redskins.  He played college football at the University of Oklahoma and was drafted in the fifteenth round of the 1942 NFL Draft.

References

External links
 
 

1918 births
1957 deaths
American football offensive guards
United States Navy personnel of World War II
Oklahoma Sooners football players
Washington Redskins players
Players of American football from Texas
People from Foard County, Texas
United States Navy sailors
United States Navy reservists